The MLily Cup, officially the MLily Meng Baihe Cup World Go Open Tournament is an international Go tournament. It is organized by the International Go Federation and the Chinese Weiqi Association. The tournament was created in 2013 and is held every two years.

Overview
The MLily Cup is played under Chinese rules with a 7.5 point komi. Each player has 2 hours of main time and five 60-second byoyomi periods, except in the finals, where the main time is 3 hours instead. The tournament has 64 players in a single-elimination format, with best-of-3 semifinals and best-of-5 finals. The winner receives 1.8 million RMB in prize money, and the runner-up receives 600,000 RMB.

Past tournaments
The 1st MLily Cup was won by 17-year-old Mi Yuting, his first international title, defeating Gu Li.

The 2nd MLily Cup champion was 18-year-old Ke Jie, his third world championship within a span of one year. In the fifth and final game, Ke Jie as Black won on a half-point ko which counted toward his score under Chinese rules, but would not have by Japanese counting.

In the 3rd MLily Cup, the organizers included Japanese Go AI DeepZenGo as a participant, a move which attracted some controversy; it was the first time a computer program was ever invited to an international Go tournament. DeepZenGo won in the first round against Shin Min-jun, and was eliminated in the second round by Wang Haoyang. The winner of the tournament was Park Junghwan.

The 4th MLily Cup started in 2019 and was won by Mi Yuting, defeating Xie Ke, on 5 May 2021.

Winners and runners-up

By nation

References

External links
Nihon Ki-in archive of the MLily Cup (in Japanese)

International Go competitions